Peter Sørensen may refer to:

 Peter Sørensen Vig (1854–1929), Danish American pastor, educator, and historian
 Peter Sørensen (footballer) (born 1973), Danish footballer
 Peter Sørensen (diplomat) (born 1967), Danish politician, the European Union Special Representative to Bosnia and Herzegovina